Diamond Dreams is an EP by American nu metalcore band Issues released on November 18, 2014.

Background
This version of The Worst of Them was released as a music video in late 2012 while Case Snedecor was still their drummer and Jake Vinston was their bassist.

In anticipation of the new EP, the band released the following statement: “We had a lot of fun making this record, being able to reimagine songs and show that we aren’t just metalcore kids, or whatever you wanna call us. We are multitalented, and we aren’t set on one taste of music; we respect and appreciate all variations. Sorry it took so long to put this out, guys!”

Track listing

Personnel
Issues
 Tyler Carter – lead vocals
 Michael Bohn – backing vocals
 AJ Rebollo – guitars
 Josh Manuel  – drums, percussion
 Skyler Acord – bass
 Tyler "Scout" Acord – keyboards, synthesizers, programming, piano

Additional musicians
 Ben Barlow - guest vocals on “Nlyf X Neck Deep”
 Nylo - guest vocals on “Tears on the Runway”
 Case Snedecor - drums on "The Worst of Them"
 Jake Vinston - bass on "The Worst of Them"

Charts

References

2014 EPs
Issues (band) albums
Rise Records EPs